Exeter is a town in Rockingham County, New Hampshire, United States. The population was 16,049 at the 2020 census, up from 14,306 at the 2010 census. Exeter was the county seat until 1997, when county offices were moved to neighboring Brentwood. Home to Phillips Exeter Academy, a private university-preparatory school, Exeter is situated where the Exeter River becomes the tidal Squamscott River.

The urban center of town, where 10,109 people resided at the 2020 census, is defined by the U.S. Census Bureau as the Exeter census-designated place.

History 

The area was once the domain of the Squamscott people, a sub-tribe of the Pennacook nation, which fished at the falls where the Exeter River becomes the tidal Squamscott, the site around which the future town of Exeter would grow. On April 3, 1638, the Reverend John Wheelwright and others purchased the land from Wehanownowit, the sagamore. Wheelwright had been exiled by the Massachusetts Bay Colony, a Puritan theocracy, for sharing the dissident religious views of his sister-in-law, Anne Hutchinson. The minister took with him about 175 individuals to found the town he named after Exeter in Devon, England. Local government was linked with Massachusetts until New Hampshire became a separate colony in 1679, but counties weren't introduced until 1769.

One of the four original townships in the province, Exeter originally included Newmarket, Newfields, Brentwood, Epping and Fremont. On July 4, 1639, 35 freemen of Exeter signed the Exeter Combination, a document written by Reverend Wheelwright to establish their own government. The settlers hunted, planted and fished. Others tended cattle and swine, or made shakes and barrel staves.

Thomas Wilson established the town's first grist mill on the eastern side of the island in the lower falls. This mill was established within the first season of settling in Exeter, and his son Humphrey assumed control of the mill in 1643, when Thomas died.

Some early Exeter settlers came from Hingham, Massachusetts, including the Gilman, Folsom and Leavitt families. In 1647, Edward Gilman, Jr. established the first sawmill, and by 1651 Gilman had his own 50-ton sloop with which to conduct his burgeoning business in lumber, staves and masts. Although he was lost at sea in 1653 while traveling to England to purchase equipment for his mills, his family later became prominent as lumbermen, shipbuilders, merchants and statesmen.

The Gilman Garrison House, a National Historic Landmark, and the American Independence Museum were both former homes of the Gilman family. The Gilman family also donated the land on which Phillips Exeter Academy stands, including the academy's original Yard, the oldest part of campus. The Gilmans of Exeter also furnished America with one of its founding fathers, Nicholas Gilman, and the state of New Hampshire with treasurers, a governor, representatives to the General Assembly and judges to the General Court.

The Gilman family began trading as far as the West Indies with ships they owned out of Portsmouth. It was a high-stakes business. In an 1803 voyage, for instance, the 180-ton clipper Oliver Peabody, owned by Gov. John Taylor Gilman, Oliver Peabody, Col. Gilman Leavitt and others, was boarded by brigs belonging to the Royal Navy under command of Admiral Horatio Nelson. Enforcing a blockade against the French, Nelson offered ship Captain Stephen Gilman of Exeter a glass of wine and paid him for his cargo in Spanish dollars. The trip demonstrates how far afield the ambitious merchants of Exeter reached in their trading forays.

Exeter suffered its last Indian raid in August 1723, and by 1725 the tribes had left the area. In 1774 the rebellious Provincial Congress began to meet in the Exeter Town House after colonial Governor John Wentworth banned it from the colonial capitol at Portsmouth. In July 1775, the Provincial Congress had the provincial records seized from royal officials in Portsmouth and brought to Exeter as well. And so Exeter became New Hampshire's capital, an honor it held for 14 years.

Exeter had a significant Black community at this time. In 1790, at the first census, Exeter had a community of 81 free Blacks (in 14 households, 11 of which they owned), and two enslaved Blacks. This was the highest percentage of Blacks in the state at 4.7%. Many Blacks, such as Jude Hall (namesake of Jude's Pond on Drinkwater Road), earned their freedom fighting in the Revolutionary War, and many settled near the west bank of the Squamscott River after the war. Jude Hall is buried in the Winter Street cemetery. Reverend Thomas Paul of the African Meeting House in Boston was born in Exeter near this time, and later in 1822 the abolitionist poet James Monroe Whitfield, a nephew of Jude Hall. In the late 1800s, two men had two dry goods stores on Water Street, John Garrison Cutler and George Harris. The net worth of both men were in the top tiers of Exeter at the time.

In 1827, the Exeter Manufacturing Company was established beside the river, using water power to produce cotton textiles. Other businesses would manufacture shoes, saddles, harnesses, lumber, boxes, bricks, carriages and bicycles. In 1836, the last schooner was launched at Exeter. In 1840, the Boston & Maine Railroad entered the town.

According to former governor Hugh Gregg, the United States Republican Party was born in Exeter on October 12, 1853, at the Squamscott Hotel at a secret meeting of Amos Tuck with other abolitionists. At this meeting, Tuck proposed forming a new political party to be called Republican. Upon learning of Tuck's meeting, in December 1853 Horace Greeley said, "I think 'Republican' would be the best name, it will sound both Jeffersonian and Madisonian, and for that reason will take well." Abraham Lincoln, the first Republican president, visited Exeter in 1860. His son, Robert Todd Lincoln, was attending Phillips Exeter Academy, the college preparatory school founded in 1781 by Dr. John Phillips. The town was also once home to the Robinson Female Seminary, established in 1867 and previously known as the Exeter Female Academy (established in 1826). Its landmark Second Empire schoolhouse, completed in 1869, burned in 1961.

In September 1965, Exeter earned a place in UFO history when local teenager Norman Muscarello and two Exeter police officers, Eugene Bertrand and David Hunt, witnessed a bright red UFO at close range. Their sighting attracted national publicity and became the focus of a bestselling book, Incident at Exeter, by journalist John G. Fuller. The Air Force eventually admitted that it had been unable to identify the strange object, and it is still considered by many UFO buffs to be one of the most impressive UFO sightings on record.

Exeter has a considerable inventory of structures by prominent architects. Arthur Gilman, descendant of one of Exeter's founding families, designed the Old Town Hall of 1855. The Old Public Library of 1894, which now is home to the Exeter Historical Society, was designed by the Boston firm of Rotch & Tilden. Ralph Adams Cram, who trained with Rotch & Tilden, designed both Phillips Church, built in 1897, and Tuck High School, built in 1911. His firm of Cram & Ferguson designed the entire Phillips Exeter Academy campus between 1908 and 1950. More recent is the noted Academy Library, built in 1971 to the design of Louis I. Kahn. Daniel Chester French, sculptor and Exeter native, created the town's war memorial in 1922. He is best known for his statue of Abraham Lincoln in Washington, D.C. at the Lincoln Memorial, which was designed by Henry Bacon, who also designed in 1916 the Swasey Pavilion at Exeter's town square.

Other features of the town include the Swasey Parkway, which replaced wharves and warehouses along the Squamscott River, and the Ioka Theatre of 1915 on Water Street. The latter was built by Edward Mayer, an Exeter judge and resident. Mayer's opening feature was The Birth of a Nation, by D. W. Griffith. The theatre's curious name was proposed in a contest by a young woman with an enthusiasm for Scouting. Ioka was a Native American word meaning "playground".

Geography 
Exeter is drained by the Exeter River, which feeds the tidal Squamscott River in the center of town. Exeter lies fully within the Piscataqua River (Coastal) watershed.

Adjacent municipalities
 Newfields, New Hampshire (north)
 Stratham, New Hampshire (east)
 Hampton, New Hampshire (southeast)
 Hampton Falls, New Hampshire (southeast)
 Kensington, New Hampshire (south)
 East Kingston, New Hampshire (southwest)
 Kingston, New Hampshire (southwest)
 Brentwood, New Hampshire (west)
 Epping, New Hampshire (northwest)

Demographics 

As of the 2010 census, there were 14,306 people, 6,114 households, and 3,729 families residing in the town. The population density was 729.9 people per square mile (281.1/km). There were 6,496 housing units at an average density of 331.4 per square mile (127.6/km). The racial makeup of the town was 95.5% White, 0.6% African American, 0.1% Native American, 2.0% Asian, 0.2% some other race, and 1.6% from two or more races. Hispanic or Latino of any race were 1.77% of the population.

There were 6,114 households, out of which 29.1% had children under the age of 18 living with them, 47.5% were headed by married couples living together, 9.8% had a female householder with no husband present, and 39.0% were non-families. 32.5% of all households were made up of individuals, and 15.2% were someone living alone who was 65 years of age or older. The average household size was 2.28, and the average family size was 2.92.

In the town, the age distribution of the population was 22.6% under the age of 18, 6.0% from 18 to 24, 22.5% from 25 to 44, 30.8% from 45 to 64, and 18.2% who were 65 years of age or older. The median age was 44.3 years. For every 100 females, there were 88.6 males. For every 100 females age 18 and over, there were 84.9 males.

For the period 2007–2011, the estimated median annual income for a household in the town was $68,777, and the median income for a family was $95,435. Male full-time workers had a median income of $64,632 versus $41,088 for females. The per capita income for the town was $38,018. About 2.5% of families and 5.7% of the population were below the poverty line, including 7.2% of those under age 18 and 4.1% of those age 65 or over.

Transportation 
The Amtrak Downeaster stops at Exeter, providing passenger rail service to Portland and Boston.

Routes 27, 85, 108, 111, and 111A meet at the town's center, and Route 88 is on the east side of the town.

Economy 
In 1990 the SIGARMS, Inc. company moved to Exeter. When it was bought by Michael Lüke and Thomas Ortmeier in October 2000, the name was changed to SIG Sauer Inc. Today, SIG Sauer is one of the world's largest firearms manufacturing entities. 

Bauer Hockey's global headquarters is in Exeter.

Notable people

Sites of interest 
 American Independence Museum
 Congregational Church in Exeter, founded 1638
 Exeter Historical Society & Museum
 Phillips Exeter Academy

See also 

List of newspapers in New Hampshire: Exeter
Exeter Inn

References

Further reading 

 Cross-Grained & Wiley Waters: A Guide to the Piscataqua Maritime Region, Jeffrey W. Bolster, Editor; Peter Randall Publisher, Portsmouth, 2001
 Exeter New Hampshire 1888–1988, Nancy C. Merrill; Peter E. Randall, Publisher, Exeter, NH 1988
 History of Exeter, New Hampshire, Charles H. Bell, Exeter, NH 1888; Reprinted by Heritage Books, 1990
 Images of America: Exeter, Carol Walker Aten; Arcadia Publishers, Dover, NH, 1996, reprint 1998
 Ports of Piscataqua: Soundings in the Maritime History of the Portsmouth, N.H., Customs District from the Days of Queen Elizabeth and the Planting of Strawberry Banke to the Times of Abraham Lincoln and the Waning of the American Clipper, William Gurdon Saltonstall, Harvard University Press, Cambridge, 1941
 Postcards from Exeter, Carol Walker Aten; Arcadia Publishers, Dover, NH, 2003
 The Exeter-Squamscott: River of Many Uses, Olive Tardiff; Peter E. Randall, Publisher, Exeter, NH 1986, 2004

External links 

 
 Exeter Historical Society
 SAU 16, Exeter Area School District
 Exeter Public Library 
 New Hampshire Economic and Labor Market Information Bureau Profile
 Exeter LitFest: Literary Trail Walking Maps

 
New Hampshire
Towns in Rockingham County, New Hampshire
Towns in New Hampshire
1638 establishments in the Thirteen Colonies
Populated places established in 1638